Huch'uy K'uchu (Quechua huch'uy small (juch'uy in Bolivia), k'uchu corner, "small corner", Hispanicized spelling Uchuycucho) is a  mountain in the La Raya mountain range in the Andes of Peru. It is located in the Cusco Region, Canas Province, Layo District, and in the Canchis Province, Marangani District. Huch'uy K'uchu lies near the La Raya pass northwest of Chimpulla and north of Kunka. It stretches along the Hatun K'uchu valley ("big corner", Atuncucho) from west to east whose stream flows to the Willkanuta River.

References

Mountains of Cusco Region
Mountains of Peru